The Battle of Campichuelo was an action fought on 19 December 1810 between revolutionary forces led by Manuel Belgrano and royalist troops on the right bank of the Paraná River, part of the Paraguay campaign of the Argentine War of Independence. It ended with a victory for the forces of Belgrano.

Antecedents
The Primera Junta sent an expedition to Paraguay in the belief that a majority of its population supported a rebellion against the rule of colonial Governor Bernardo de Velasco. On 24 September they agreed to send General Manuel Belgrano, who had been appointed governor and captain general of the Banda Oriental by decree of 4 September.

The battle
Because Paraguayan royalists had removed all boats on the River Paraná along its borders, Belgrano's forces had to build boats from leather, some canoes and large wooden rafts suitable to carry 60 men and four cannon, as the crossing was expected to be opposed. The river was 1000 meters wide at the crossing point, and the current would carry them a league and a half downstream, to Campichuelo hill. The passage started at 11:00 pm on 18 December, when a force of 12 men surprised the enemy, taking two prisoners and some weapons. The main crossing took place from 3:00 am until 6:00 am on 19 December under the command of Major General Machain, forcing the enemy to abandon their position.

Belgrano was operating from the former capital mission of Santa Maria de la Candelaria (Misiones Province today) and nearby sites located in the Argentine province of Corrientes. Belgrano led a small force: 800 men, half cavalry and infantry, with six small-caliber cannon. They faced a 500-man royalist force led by Pablo Thompson. Belgrano issued a proclamation asking the royalists to join the revolutionary ranks; on their refusal he attacked and defeated the royalist forces.

References

Amphibious operations involving Argentina
Battles of the Argentine War of Independence
Battles involving canoes
Battles involving Paraguay
History of Itapúa Department
Conflicts in 1810
December 1810 events